Euphoria is an album by the American band Leftover Salmon. It was released via Hollywood Records in 1997. The band supported the album by touring with the 1997 H.O.R.D.E. festival.

The album peaked at number three on Billboard Heatseekers – Mountain chart.

Production
Recorded in Denver, the album was produced by Justin Niebank. Pete Sears contributed keyboard parts to Euphoria.

Critical reception

The Gazette called the album a "tame approximation" of the band's live sound. The Pittsburgh Post-Gazette labeled the album "alternative country," and deemed it "tight and conservative." Writer Dean Budnick described the album as "an agreeable representation" of the band's "stylistic hodgepodge," and noted that, in some instances, it "does indeed achieve the state referenced by its title."

Track listing
All songs written by Drew Emmitt, except where noted.
"Better" (Vince Herman)
"Highway Song"
"Baby Hold On"
"River's Rising"
"Mama Boulet" (Herman)
"Funky Mountain Fogdown" (Mark Vann)
"Cash on the Barrelhead" (Charlie Louvin and Ira Louvin)
"Muddy Water Home"
"Ain't Gonna Work" (Traditional)
"This Is the Time"
"Euphoria" (Robin Remaily)

Personnel

Musical
Vince Herman – vocals, acoustic guitar, rubboard
Drew Emmitt – electric guitar, mandolin, vocals
Mark Vann – banjo, vocals
Tye North – bass, vocals
Michael Wooten – drums, percussion
Jeremy Lawton – electric piano
Pete Sears – electric piano, Hammond organ, piano
Sam Bush – fiddle
Sally Van Meter – lap steel guitar

Technical
Glenn Meadows – mastering
Jeremy Lawton – electric piano, engineer, assistant engineer
Leftover Salmon – arranger
Justin Neibank – arranger, producer, engineer, mixing

References 

Leftover Salmon albums
1997 albums